At the 1928 Winter Olympics, only one bobsleigh event was contested, the five man event. The competition was held on Saturday, 18 February 1928.

Medalists

Results

Participating nations

A total of 115 bobsledders from 14 nations competed at the St. Moritz Games:

Medal table

References

External links
International Olympic Committee results database
Official Olympic Report
sports-reference
1928 bobsleigh five-man results

 
1928 Winter Olympics
1928 Winter Olympics events
Olympics
Bobsleigh in Switzerland